Thik Jeno Love Story was a Bengali television Soap Opera that premiered on 10 November 2014 and aired on Star Jalsha. It was produced by Shree Venkatesh Films and it stars Neel Bhattacharya and Sairity Banerjee in lead roles.

Plot 
The story revolves around Isha, a simple girl full of life and Adi, the spoilt brat of an influential politician. Isha having lost her parents in the childhood grew up with her brothers Prabal and Pratik who dote on her. She is a die hard romantic and spends her time with her two best friends Pooja and Neha.

Pooja starts chatting with a mystery man on the Internet who turns out to be Adi. They plan to meet during the opening of a night club. Things however get out of hand and Pooja dies due to drug overdose while Isha is saved by Adi. The only witness to Pooja's death is Prabal who considers Adi responsible for it. Isha however trusts Adi completely and saves him from accusations. Prabal becomes uncomfortable with Isha's growing relationship with Adi and warns him to stay away from his sister and insults him in the process.

Adi vows revenge and plans to manipulate Isha by promising to marry her. Unaware of Adi's evils ploys Isha continues to fall for him and ends up marrying him. Adi however lifts the blindfold of trust from Isha's eyes and declares that it was all but a game for him that he did not consider the marriage to be anything serious. Isha then decides to leave Adi forever but is stopped by Adi's father who believes that only Isha could save Adi from the path of self-destruction he was on. Isha decides to stay and give her relationship another chance as she believes in the basic goodness of Adi's heart.

Cast 
 Neel Bhattacharya as Adidev Bose / Adi
 Sairity Banerjee as Late Isha Bose (née Mitra) / Aankhi Bose (née Mitra)
 Dipankar De as Ranjan Bose
 Debolina Dutta as Rajeshwari / Mon
 Manoj Ojha as Agnidev Bose / Natun Gosain
 Ananya Biswas as Ani
 Avrajit Chakraborty as Sanjay
 Dolon Roy as Krishna
 Arijit Chakraborty as Probal Mitra
 John Bhattacharya as Rohit
 Ayesha Bhattacharya as Tiya
 Mita Chatterjee as Adi's grandmother
 Moumita Chakraborty as Menoka
 Sohan Bandopadhyay as Raktim
 Debdut Ghosh as Siddhartha Bose
 Soham Basu Roy Chowdhury as Nonta
 Runa Bandopadhyay as Kaberi
 Rupam Roy as Pratik Mitra
 Deerghoi Paul as Neha
 Alivia Sarkar as Pooja
 Ashmita Chakraborty as Mimi
 Somraj Maity as Tunir Sengupta
 Sourav Das as Kripan
 Anindya Bose as Siddhartha
 Sanchaari Das as Komol

Awards

References 

2014 Indian television series debuts
2015 Indian television series endings
Bengali-language television programming in India
Star Jalsha original programming